Pycnococcaceae is a family of green algae in the order Pseudoscourfieldiales. The defining features of this family include the single invagination of the pyrenoid where the mitochondrial membrane fits into it  and the "decapore" - a ring of 10 pores through the thick cell wall.

References

External links

Green algae families
Pyramimonadophyceae